Andrew Nicholson Farmstead is a historic home and farm located in Steen Township, Knox County, Indiana. The house was built in 1863, and is a two-story, five bay, vernacular Greek Revival style brick I-house. An addition to the rear ell was made in 1909.  Also on the property are the contributing English barn (1905), garage (1920s), corn crib (1937), and milk house, smokehouse and fruit house ruins (1863).

It was added to the National Register of Historic Places in 2005.

References

I-houses in Indiana
Farms on the National Register of Historic Places in Indiana
Greek Revival houses in Indiana
Houses completed in 1863
Buildings and structures in Knox County, Indiana
National Register of Historic Places in Knox County, Indiana
1863 establishments in Indiana